Lyons Creek is an  tributary of the Patuxent River in Maryland. Lyons Creek serves as the border between southern Anne Arundel County, Maryland and northern Calvert County, Maryland.

References

Rivers of Maryland
Rivers of Calvert County, Maryland
Tributaries of the Patuxent River